Tahitian (Tahitian: , part of , languages of French Polynesia) is a Polynesian language, spoken mainly on the Society Islands in French Polynesia. It belongs to the Eastern Polynesian group.

As Tahitian had no written tradition before the arrival of the Western colonists, the spoken language was first transcribed by missionaries of the London Missionary Society in the early 19th century.

Context
Tahitian is the most prominent of the indigenous Polynesian languages spoken in French Polynesia. The latter also include:
Marquesan, spoken by about 8,000 people in the Marquesas Islands, with two sub-divisions, North-Western and South-Eastern
Paumotu, spoken by about 4,000 people in the Tuamotu Islands
Austral, spoken by about 3,000 people in the Austral Islands
Rapa, spoken by about 400 people on Rapa Iti
Raivavae, spoken by about 900 people in the Austral Islands
Mangareva, spoken by about 600 people in the Gambier Islands

History
When Europeans first arrived in Tahiti at the end of the 18th century, there was no writing system and Tahitian was only a spoken language. Reports by some early European explorers including Quirós include attempts to transcribe notable Tahitian words heard during initial interactions with the indigenous people of Marquesa. Aboard the Endeavour, Lt. James Cook and the ship's master, Robert Molyneux, transcribed the names of 72 and 55 islands respectively as recited by the Tahitian arioi, Tupaia. Many of these were "non-geographic" or "ghost islands" of Polynesian mythology and all were transcribed using phonetic English spelling. In 1797, Protestant missionaries arrived in Tahiti on a British ship called Duff, captained by James Wilson. Among the missionaries was Henry Nott (1774–1844) who learned the Tahitian language and worked with Pōmare II, a Tahitian king, and the Welsh missionary, John Davies (1772–1855), to translate the Bible into Tahitian. A system of five vowels and nine consonants was adopted for the Tahitian Bible, which would become the key text by which many Polynesians would learn to read and write. John Davies's spelling book (1810) was the first book to be printed in the Tahitian language. He also published a grammar and a dictionary of that language.

Phonology 
Tahitian features a very small number of phonemes: five vowels and nine consonants, not counting the lengthened vowels and diphthongs. Notably, the consonant inventory lacks any sort of phonemic dorsal consonants.

There is a five-vowel inventory with vowel length:

When two vowels follow each other in a V1V2 sequence, they form a diphthong when V1 is more open, and as a consequence more sonorant, than V2. An exception to this rule is the sequence , which never becomes the diphthong . Two vowels with the same sonority are generally pronounced in hiatus, as in  'November', but there is some variability.

Next follows a table with all phonemes in more detail.

This is typical of Polynesian languages (compare to the Hawaiian okina and others). See Typography below.

However, macrons are seldom written among older people because Tahitian writing was not taught at school until 1981.

While standard Tahitian only has  as a result of dissimilation, the dialects of the Leeward Islands have many cases of  corresponding to standard Tahitian . For example, inhabitants of Maupiti pronounce their island's name .

It does not indicate a different pronunciation. Usage of this diacritic was promoted by academics but has now virtually disappeared, mostly because there is no difference in the quality of the vowel when the trema is used and when the macron is used.

Tahitian syllables are entirely open, as is usual in Polynesian languages. If a content word is composed of a single syllable with a single vowel, its vowel must be long. Thus, every Tahitian content word is at least two moras long.

Stress 
Stress is predictable in Tahitian. It always falls on one of the final three syllables of a word, and relies on the distinction between heavy and light syllables. Syllables with diphthongs or with long vowels are both considered to be heavy. Other syllables are considered to be light. Heavy syllables always bear secondary stress. In general main stress falls on the penultimate syllable in a word. However, if there is a long vowel or diphthong in the last syllable, that syllable receives main stress. If there is a long vowel in the antepenultimate syllable, and the penultimate syllable is light, the antepenultimate syllable receives main stress.

There is another type of words whose stress pattern requires another rule to explain. These include  'first',  'shoe',  'king', all of which are stressed on the antepenultimate syllable. In all these words, the last two vowels are identical, and are separated by a glottal stop. One can posit that in such words, the last syllable is extrametrical, and does not count towards stress assignment.
This extrametricality does not apply in the case of words with only two syllables, which remain stressed on the penultimate syllable.

In compound words, each morpheme's stressed syllable carries secondary stress, and the stressed syllable of the last morpheme carries primary stress. Thus, for example,  'airplane', from  'bird' and  'leave', is pronounced .
Tahitian has reduplication as well. The endings of some verbs can be duplicated in order to add a repetitive sense to the verb. For example,  becomes ,  'do quickly' becomes , and  'to tear' becomes . In reduplicated verbs, the final verb ending bears main stress while the earlier ones bears secondary stress.

When suffixes are added to a word, primary and secondary stresses in the root word are maintained as secondary and tertiary stresses, and a new primary stress is calculated for the word. Tertiary and secondary stress are often merged. The suffix does not always carry main stress. For example, when the nominalizing suffix  is applied to verbs, regular stress assignment results in the last syllable of the root verb being stressed.

Prefixes added to a root word do not carry primary stress. For example,  'vision', related to  'vision', is stressed on the second syllable, and not the first, even though it has a long vowel. This can also be seen with the verb  'to be understood'. When combined with the causative prefix , it becomes , which is stressed on the penultimate syllable.

Typography 

In former practice, the glottal stop used to be seldom written, but today it is commonly spelled out, although often as a straight apostrophe (see below) instead of the turned curly apostrophe used in Hawaiian. Alphabetical word ordering in dictionaries used to ignore the existence of glottal stops. However, academics and scholars now publish text content with due use of glottal stops.

There are at least a dozen other ways of applying accents. Some methods are historical and no longer used. At this moment, the Académie tahitienne seems to have not made a final decision yet whether the  should appear as a normal letter apostrophe or a turned letter apostrophe (called ʻokina in Hawaiian).

As the ASCII apostrophe is the character output when hitting the apostrophe key on a usual French AZERTY keyboard, it has become natural for writers to use the punctuation mark for glottal stops, although to avoid the complications caused by substituting punctuation characters for letters in digital documents, the saltillo may be used instead.

Grammar 
In its morphology, Tahitian relies on the use of "helper words" (such as prepositions, articles, and particles) to encode grammatical relationships, rather than on inflection, as would be typical of European languages. It is a very analytic language, except when it comes to the personal pronouns, which have separate forms for singular, plural and dual numbers.

Personal pronouns
Like many Austronesian languages, Tahitian has separate words for inclusive and exclusive we, and distinguishes singular, dual, and plural.

Singular 
  ( after "a", "o" or "u") 'I, me':  'I have eaten the fish';  'I will go to school tomorrow'.
  'you':  'You have eaten the fish';  'You damaged our car'.
  'he, she':  'He/she ate the fish';  'Why is she here/why did she come here?';  'He/she is not here'.

Dual 
  '(inclusive) we/us two':  'We (us two) have eaten the fish';  'Let's go' (literally 'go us two');  'Our friend has arrived'.
  '(exclusive) we/us two':  'We have eaten the fish';  'Titaua and I will return/go home';  'That is our house'.
  'you two':  'You two ate the fish';  'You (two) go';  'This book belongs to both of you'.
  'they two':  'They (they two) have eaten the fish';  'Where are they (they two) from?';  'He/she and Pa stayed home'.

Plural 
  '(inclusive) we':  'Who are we waiting for/expecting?',  'There won't be any of our food more left'.
  '(exclusive) we, they and I':  'We came with Herenui';  'You saw us/you have seen us'.
 'you (plural)':  'You (all) go, I will follow';  'Who went fishing with you (all)?'
  'they/them':  'They have quarrelled with Teina';  They have the strongest team.

Word order
Typologically, Tahitian word order is VSO (verb–subject–object), which is typical of Polynesian languages. Some examples of word order are:

[ – 'Are thing dry the coconut', 'The coconuts are dry']

[ – 'Is man strong he', 'He is a strong man']

Articles

Definite article
The article  is the definite article and means 'the'. In conversation it is also used as an indefinite article for 'a' or 'an' – for example:
 – 'the house';  – 'the man'

The plural of the definite article  is  – for example:
 – 'the houses';  – 'the men'

 alone (with no plural marking) can also encode an unspecified, generic number – for example:

 – 'the person' [specific singular] or 'people' [generic singular in Tahitian, generic plural in English]
vs.
 – 'the people' [specific plural]

Indefinite article

The indefinite article is 

For example;
  – 'a person'

The article  also introduces an indefinite common noun.

For example;
 – 'a person'
 – 'a woman'
 – '(many) women'

In contrast,  means 'a certain'.

For example;
 – 'a certain house'

The article  is used with proper nouns and pronouns and implies 'it is'.

For example;
 – '(it is) Tahiti'
 – '(it is) they'

Aspect and modality markers

Verbal aspect and modality are important parts of Tahitian grammar, and are indicated with markers preceding and/or following the invariant verb. Important examples are:

: expresses an unfinished action or state.
: , 'Mary will sing tonight'

: expresses a finished action, a state different from a preceding state. [ does not indicate surprise]

: , 'I am angry'

: indicates progressive aspect.
: , 'I am planting the taro'

 : , 'He is always late'
 indicates a finished action or a past state.
: , 'She was born in Tahiti'
 indicates an action finished in the immediate past.
 'He just came'
 indicates a wish, desire, supposition, or condition.
 'Hurry up!'
 indicates a command or obligation.
 'Bend down!'
 indicates negative imperative.
 'Do not speak'
,  indicates a condition or hypothetical supposition.
 'If the boat had capsized, we would all be dead'
 expresses negation.
 'I will not return'

Taboo names –  

In many parts of Polynesia the name of an important leader was (and sometimes still is) considered sacred (tapu) and was therefore accorded appropriate respect (mana). In order to avoid offense, all words resembling such a name were suppressed and replaced by another term of related meaning until the personage died. If, however, the leader should happen to live to a very great age this temporary substitution could become permanent.

In the rest of Polynesia tū means 'to stand', but in Tahitian it became  because the word was included in the name of king Tū-nui-ēa-i-te-atua. Likewise fetū ('star') has become in Tahiti  and aratū ('pillar') became . Currently  means 'path' while  means 'road'.

Tū also had a nickname, Pō-mare (literally means 'night coughing'), under which his dynasty has become best known.

Other examples include:
 ('water') became  as in the names of Papeari, Papenoo, Papeete
 ('sleep') became  (the original meaning of which was 'to lie down').

Some of the old words are still used on the Leewards.

See also

 Lord Monboddo
 Swadesh list of Tahitian words

Notes

References
 
 
Y. Lemaître, Lexique du tahitien contemporain, 1973. 
 same; 2nd, reviewed edition, 1995. 
T. Henry, Ancient Tahiti – Tahiti aux temps anciens

External links
1851 Tahitian–English dictionary
1898 Tahitian-French dictionary
Tahitian Swadesh list of basic vocabulary words (from Wiktionary's Swadesh-list appendix)
Académie Tahitienne – Fare Vānaa
Puna Reo – Cultural Association, English section too
Index cards of plant and animal names from the 1960s archived with Kaipuleohone

Society Islands
Tahitic languages
Endangered Austronesian languages
Languages of French Polynesia
Verb–subject–object languages